NGC 3596 is an intermediate spiral galaxy in the constellation Leo.  It was discovered by William Herschel 1784.  It is located below the star Theta Leonis (Chertan). It is a member of the Leo II Groups, a series of galaxies and galaxy clusters strung out from the right edge of the Virgo Supercluster.

References

External links
 
 Galaxy NGC 3596
 

Intermediate spiral galaxies
Leo (constellation)
3596
06277
34298